Andrei Sergeyevich Makhayev (born 13 September 1982) is a former Russian football player.

References

1982 births
Footballers from Moscow
Living people
Russian footballers
FC Saturn Ramenskoye players
Russian Premier League players
FC Khimki players
Association football forwards
FC Chertanovo Moscow players